The meridian 177° east of Greenwich is a line of longitude that extends from the North Pole across the Arctic Ocean, Asia, the Pacific Ocean, New Zealand, the Southern Ocean, and Antarctica to the South Pole.

The 177th meridian east forms a great circle with the 3rd meridian west.

From Pole to Pole
Starting at the North Pole and heading south to the South Pole, the 177th meridian east passes through:

{| class="wikitable plainrowheaders"
! scope="col" width="130" | Co-ordinates
! scope="col" | Country, territory or sea
! scope="col" | Notes
|-
| style="background:#b0e0e6;" | 
! scope="row" style="background:#b0e0e6;" | Arctic Ocean
| style="background:#b0e0e6;" |
|-
| style="background:#b0e0e6;" | 
! scope="row" style="background:#b0e0e6;" | East Siberian Sea
| style="background:#b0e0e6;" |
|-
| 
! scope="row" | 
| Chukotka Autonomous Okrug
|-
| style="background:#b0e0e6;" | 
! scope="row" style="background:#b0e0e6;" | Bering Sea
| style="background:#b0e0e6;" | Passing just west of Kiska Island, Alaska,  (at )
|-valign="top"
| style="background:#b0e0e6;" | 
! scope="row" style="background:#b0e0e6;" | Pacific Ocean
| style="background:#b0e0e6;" | Passing just east of Arorae atoll,  (at ) Passing just west of Nui atoll,  (at ) Passing just west of the island of Rotuma,  (at ) Passing just east of the island of Viwa,  (at ) Passing just west of the island of Waya,  (at ) Passing just west of the Mamanuca Islands,  (at ) Passing just west of Whakaari/White Island,  (at )
|-
| 
! scope="row" | 
| North Island — passing through the town of Whakatane (at )
|-
| style="background:#b0e0e6;" | 
! scope="row" style="background:#b0e0e6;" | Pacific Ocean
| style="background:#b0e0e6;" | Hawke Bay
|-
| 
! scope="row" | 
| North Island
|-
| style="background:#b0e0e6;" | 
! scope="row" style="background:#b0e0e6;" | Pacific Ocean
| style="background:#b0e0e6;" |
|-
| style="background:#b0e0e6;" | 
! scope="row" style="background:#b0e0e6;" | Southern Ocean
| style="background:#b0e0e6;" |
|-
| 
! scope="row" | Antarctica
| Ross Dependency — claimed by 
|-
|}

See also
176th meridian east
178th meridian east

e177 meridian east